Pocota bomboides is a species of syrphid fly in the family Syrphidae.

Distribution
Canada, United States.

References

Eristalinae
Articles created by Qbugbot
Diptera of North America
Insects described in 1897